Palaemon ortmanni is a species of shrimp of the family Palaemonidae. The species has been found in China, Japan, and Taiwan.

References

Crustaceans described in 1902
Fauna of China
Fauna of Japan
Fauna of Taiwan
Palaemonidae